Cracroft is a surname. Some notable people with the name include:

As a surname
 Bridget Cracroft-Eley (1933–2008), British magistrate
 John Cracroft-Amcotts (1891–1956), English politician
 Richard H. Cracroft (1936–2012), American author and academic
 Sophia Cracroft (1816-1892), niece of the explorer Sir John Franklin. Namesake of West Cracroft Island, East Cracroft Island, and the Sophia Islets.
 Weston Cracroft Amcotts (born William Cracroft; 1815–1883), English MP
 Weston Cracroft-Amcotts (1888–1975), English politician, grandson of the above

As a given name
 Wilfrid Cracroft Ash (1884–1968), British civil engineer
 Bernard Cracroft Aston (1871–1951), New Zealand chemist and botanist
 Andrew Cracroft Becher (1858–1929), British Army officer
 Arthur Cracroft Gibson (1863–1895), British cricketer
 Mary Victoria Cracroft Grigg (1897–1971), New Zealand politician
 John Cracroft Wilson (1808–1881), British Indian civil servant

 English-language surnames